The Kilkenny Intermediate Hurling Championship (known for sponsorship reasons as Michael Lyng Motors Intermediate Hurling Championship and abbreviated to the Kilkenny IHC) is an annual hurling competition organised by the Kilkenny County Board of the Gaelic Athletic Association and contested by intermediate clubs in the county of Kilkenny in Ireland. It is the second tier overall in the entire Kilkenny hurling championship system.

The Kilkenny Intermediate Championship was introduced in 1929 as a competition that would bridge the gap between the senior grade and the junior grade. The championship was suspended for over 30 years until the 1970s when it was reinstated.

In its current format, the Kilkenny Intermediate Championship begins in September with a first round series of games comprising eight teams, while the four remaining teams receive byes to the quarter-final stage. A team's finishing position in the Kilkenny Intermediate League determines at what stage they enter the championship. Four rounds of games are played, culminating with the final match at UPMC Nowlan Park in October. The winner of the Kilkenny Intermediate Championship, as well as being presented with the Hanrahan Cup, qualifies for the subsequent Leinster Club Championship and gains automatic entry into the following year's Kilkenny Senior Championship.

The competition has been won by 29 teams. Conahy Shamrocks, Mullinavat and Clara are the most successful teams in the tournament's history, having won it four times each. Glenmore are the reigning champions, having beaten St Lachtain's by 3–19 to 2–09 in the 2021 final.

Roll of honour

Roll of honour

 2020 Lisdowney won on penalties

References

External links
 Kilkenny GAA Bible

 
Hurling competitions in County Kilkenny
Kilkenny GAA club championships
Intermediate hurling county championships